The Belle of Rome is a 1955 Italian comedy film directed by Luigi Comencini.

Cast
 Silvana Pampanini: Nannina
 Alberto Sordi: Gracco
 Paolo Stoppa: Oreste
 Antonio Cifariello: Mario
 Luisella Beghi: Ines
 Sergio Tofano: Agostino
 Giulio Calì: railway-man
 Lina Volonghi: Tina
 Ciccio Barbi: the priest
 Bice Valori: Sister Serafina
 Gigi Reder: Luigi

References

External links
 

1955 films
1955 comedy films
Italian comedy films
Films directed by Luigi Comencini
Films scored by Nino Rota
Films set in Rome
Italian black-and-white films
1950s Italian films